James B. French (1857–1932) was a member of the Wisconsin State Assembly.

Biography
French was born on July 29, 1857, in Alton, New Hampshire. He graduated from the University of Iowa in 1882. In 1888, he settled in Superior, Wisconsin. French died in 1932 and is interred in Superior.

Career
French was a member of the Assembly during the 1911, 1919 and 1921 sessions. Additionally, he was Chairman of the Republican Committee of Douglas County, Wisconsin.

References

1857 births
1932 deaths
People from Alton, New Hampshire
Politicians from Superior, Wisconsin
Republican Party members of the Wisconsin State Assembly
University of Iowa alumni